ITC SRA Sangeet Sammelan is an annual Indian classical music festival organised by ITC Sangeet Research Academy held by turn in various cities in India.

History
The first ITC Sangeet Sammelan was held in 1971.

See also 
List of Hindustani classical music festivals
 Swara Samrat festival

References

External links
 

Music festivals established in 1971
Hindustani classical music festivals
Music festivals in India